The Old Dominion Monarchs football program represents Old Dominion University in U.S. college football. The first iteration of the team created in 1930 was known as the William & Mary Norfolk Division Braves. Founded in 2009, the current Monarchs team competed as an FCS independent for their first two seasons. In the 2011 season, they joined the Colonial Athletic Association and added conference games to their schedule, playing there until joining the Conference USA of the FBS in 2014. They joined the Sun Belt Conference in 2022.

History

Early history: Tommy Scott era (1930–1940)

According to sports historian Peter Stewart, in September 1930 a reporter asked Coach Tommy Scott whether the Norfolk Division of the College of William & Mary should have a football team. Scott answered that he had not thought of having one, but within two days a team was "put together hurriedly" and began playing other small colleges. In late December 1932, the team played the University of Miami Hurricanes in Miami, after the four-year college sent an invitation to William & Mary which the two-year Norfolk Division accidentally received.  The college played football for 11 seasons (1930–1940), with a record of 42–36–4.  The program was discontinued due to a rule against freshman players, a $10,000 debt, and accreditation issues. The team lost every game in its last season, attendance was small, and Stewart believes that World War II would likely have forced the program to end regardless of other reasons.

Bobby Wilder era (2007–2019)

According to Senior Associate Athletic Director Debbie White, ODU had tried several times to restart a football team. The university wanted to improve ties to alumni, who often stated in exit interviews before graduation their wish for an ODU football team, and rarely revisited the campus. On June 14, 2005, the Board of Visitors unanimously approved with a 14–0 vote to create a new football team to compete, along with the university's other sports teams, at the NCAA Division I level. The new football team were to begin play in 2009. On February 9, 2007, Athletic Director Jim Jarrett announced that Bobby Wilder, then the associate head football coach at the University of Maine, would be the head coach and the team signed its first recruiting class in 2008. As is the case with many new football programs, all players in 2008 were redshirted. These players, along with the recruiting class of 2009 and transfer players, comprised the initial 2009 roster.

Old Dominion began play in 2009 as an independent team at the Division I FCS level (formerly I-AA), and joined the Colonial Athletic Association (CAA) for the 2011 season. In their first competitive season in 68 years, the Monarchs finished the season with a 9–2 record. That was the best winning record ever for a first-year program in college football's modern era. The Monarchs were outscored by a total of only eight points in their two losses. Wilder's inaugural team finished the year ranked in the top ten in five FCS statistical categories, including second in sacks allowed, third in scoring offense, turnover margin and net punting. The 2009 Monarchs were ninth in rushing offense.

ODU was fifth in FCS attendance in 2009, selling out all of their home games in the 19,782-seat Foreman Field.  Season tickets for the Monarchs' inaugural season sold out quickly and the school had to refund 1,065 orders. Foreman Field, formerly the ODU field hockey and women's lacrosse teams' home venue, was renovated to accommodate the new football program. Field hockey and women's lacrosse were relocated to the Powhatan Sports Complex.

In its first three years of competition after its rebirth, Old Dominion compiled a 26–7 record and earned a berth in the 2011 FCS playoffs, hosting and defeating its crosstown rival Norfolk State. Also in 2011, after playing 27 games in its "modern era", ODU received its first Top 25 ranking on October 3, coming in at No. 21 in The Sports Network poll. The Monarchs were ranked among the Top Ten after competing in 33 games.

CAA years: 2011–2012
In 2011, ODU completed their first season in the CAA with a 9–2 record and a second-place finish in the conference. Most media had picked ODU to finish near the bottom of the conference. However, ODU outperformed those predictions and ultimately hosted a first round FCS playoff game. On 26 November 2011 the ODU Monarchs beat their crosstown rivals, the Norfolk State Spartans, 35–18 to advance to the second round of the 2011 FCS playoffs. ODU then traveled to Georgia to play the Georgia Southern Eagles in the second round of the playoffs, where they lost 55–48. Following the season, the Monarchs finished 10th in the final poll.

In April 2012, several reports linked ODU to possible realignment in FBS conferences Big East and Conference USA (C-USA) with possible conference play that begin as soon as 2013. The Big East reports were silenced with the addition of schools University of Houston, University of Central Florida, Southern Methodist University, and University of Memphis. However, the C-USA was still interested in ODU after adding five new schools including University of North Carolina at Charlotte, Florida International, University of North Texas, Louisiana Tech, and Texas-San Antonio.

In May 2012, it was officially announced that ODU would join C-USA for all sports effective July 1, 2013.

Despite being voted ineligible for the conference automatic bid and conference title, the Monarchs finished atop the CAA with a 7–1 in conference record. By finishing the regular season 10–1, the Monarchs won an at large bid into the 2012 NCAA Division I FCS Playoffs. The Monarchs lost to Georgia Southern 49–35 in the quarterfinals of the playoffs after the Eagles mounted a comeback by out-scoring the Monarchs 28–0 in the fourth quarter. During the loss to Georgia Southern, sophomore quarterback Taylor Heinicke passed Steve McNair for the most passing yards in a single season by an FCS quarterback with 5,076 yards. He also became the first quarterback to eclipse the 5,000 yard mark in a season as well as setting the record for most completions in a season with 398.

Move to FBS
ODU began its transition to the NCAA Division I Football Bowl Subdivision (FBS) at the conclusion of the 2012 season. The Monarchs spent 2013 as an FCS independent team. Originally, the 2014 season was to be spent as an FBS independent before being fully accepted into the C-USA with both bowl and championship eligibility.  After a vote by the C-USA, it was changed so that the program would be eligible in 2014 for the conference title and a bowl berth.

The Monarchs won the final 3 games of the 2014 season to finished the season 6–6 and tied for 3rd in the east division of C-USA. 2014 was also Heinicke's final year at ODU.

In 2015 ODU football team competed fully bowl eligible. On September 19, 2015, North Carolina State played at Foreman Field. It was the first ACC and Power 5 school to play Old Dominion in Norfolk.

Prior to the 2016 season, Old Dominion announced that it would redevelop Foreman Field in two phases: Phase I would increase the capacity from 20,118 to 22,130 after rebuilding the east and west grandstands between the 2018 and 2019 seasons. Phase II would increase the capacity from 22,130 to 30,004. A timeline for Phase II has not been announced.

After a 10–3 season in 2016 (7-1 in C-USA play), Old Dominion made it to their first bowl berth, defeating Central Michigan in the 2016 Bahamas Bowl.

On September 22, 2018, Old Dominion shocked then No. 13 Virginia Tech by defeating them 49–35 at home in front of a record crowd of 20,532. This game marked the first Monarch victory over both a Power 5 and ranked opponent. On November 17, 2018, the Monarchs played their last game at the 82 year-old Foreman Field. The field was demolished for renovation after the game and was subsequently renamed Komblau Field at S.B. Ballard Stadium.

On April 26, 2019, Oshane Ximines became the first Old Dominion player selected in the NFL Draft. He was drafted by the New York Giants in the third round with the 95th overall pick in the 2019 NFL Draft.
 
On December 2, 2019, Wilder resigned as the head coach of Old Dominion.

Ricky Rahne era (2020–present)
Ricky Rahne, former Penn State offensive coordinator, was announced as the next head coach on December 10, 2019. Amid the COVID-19 pandemic, the university announced that the 2020 football season for the Monarchs was canceled due to concerns about the safety of athletes and coaches.

Rahne coached his first full season in 2021. After a 1-5 start ODU went on a 5 game winning streak to end the regular season 6-6; while becoming Bowl eligible for the second time in program history. ODU played in the Myrtle Beach Bowl, but lost to Tulsa.

The 2022 season had some big changes. As the Monarchs across all sports moved into the Sun Belt Conference in July of that year, leaving C-USA (along with Southern Miss and Marshall). ODU would start with a upset win over Virginia Tech by a final score 20-17.

Conference affiliations
 Independent (1930–1940)
 NCAA Division I FCS independent (2009–2010, 2013)
 Colonial Athletic Association (2011–2012)
 Conference USA (2014–2022)
 Sun Belt Conference (2022 and beyond)

Postseason

Division championships
ODU competes in the East Division of C-USA since joining the conference in 2014. The Monarchs shared its first division title with Western Kentucky in 2016 but did not represent the East Division in the C-USA Championship Game due to a head-to-head loss to Western Kentucky.

† Co-champions

Playoffs
The Monarchs appeared in the Division I-AA/FCS Playoffs twice in the only two years that they were in FCS competition before moving up to FBS. Their combined record is 2–2.

Bowl games
In 2016 ODU bounced back from a 5–7 campaign the previous season to go 9–3 in the regular season and become bowl eligible for the first time. ODU clinched their 6th win on the year against C-USA power Marshall in Week 10 of the regular season. ODU went on to win the final 5 games of the regular season and accepted an invitation to play in the Bahamas Bowl to play Eastern Michigan and went on to beat EMU 24–20 for their first bowl win and finished the year 10–3. ODU recorded their 54th consecutive sellout against FIU in the home finale.

Rivalries

James Madison

On October 26, the Old Dominion Monarchs and in-state rival James Madison Dukes announced the official beginning of the "Royal Rivalry".  As the Virginia-based schools within the Sun Belt Conference, they will compete for an all-sports trophy that contains a football component and draws its name from the royal inspiration of both schools' mascots.

Old Dominion leads the all-time football series between the two schools 2–1, dating back to their days in the CAA.  JMU won the most recent meeting 37–3 on November 12, 2022.

William & Mary

A declared rivalry with the William & Mary Tribe lasted two years before the Monarchs began their FBS transfer process in 2013. The annual CAA divisional battles were coined the ‘Battle for the Silver Mace' with the winner to be presented with a replica of the Norfolk Mace on display at the Chrysler Museum of Art.

Norfolk State

Individual awards

All-Americans

National Awards
 Walter Payton AwardFCS Most Outstanding Offensive Player
QB Taylor Heinicke – 2012
 FCS Player of the Year
QB Taylor Heinicke – 2012
 Dudley AwardVirginia's Best College Player
QB Taylor Heinicke – 2012

Conference Awards
 Offensive Player of the Year
QB Taylor Heinicke – 2012 CAA
 Defensive Player of the Year
DT Ronnie Cameron – 2011 CAA
 Freshman of the Year
RB Ray Lawry –  2014 C-USA

Source: Old Dominion Athletics, The Sports Network

Future non-conference opponents 
Announced schedules as of August 24, 2022. Four FCS opponents were added to future schedules on February 2, 2023.

Monarchs in the NFL
Since the sport was restarted in the school in 2009, two players have been drafted to the National Football League.

Rick Lovato, a 2015 graduate of Old Dominion University, played for the Philadelphia Eagles in Super Bowl LII (2018). In Super Bowl LVII (2023), two ODU football players are on the roster: Zach Pascal and Rick Lovato.

References

External links

 

American football teams established in 1930
American football teams disestablished in 1941
American football teams established in 2009
1930 establishments in Virginia
1941 disestablishments in Virginia
2009 establishments in Virginia